The 2014 Men's Junior NORCECA Volleyball Championship was the ninth edition of the bi-annual volleyball tournament, played by ten countries from July 29 – August 3, 2014 in San Salvador, El Salvador. Cuba won their 5th championship. Cuba, Canada and United States also qualify for the 2015 Men's Junior World Championship.

Competing Nations

Pool standing procedure
Match won 3–0: 5 points for the winner, 0 point for the loser
Match won 3–1: 4 points for the winner, 1 points for the loser
Match won 3–2: 3 points for the winner, 2 points for the loser
In case of tie, the teams were classified according to the following criteria:
points ratio and sets ratio.

First round

Pool A

Pool B

Pool C

Final round

Championship bracket

Classification 9

Quarterfinals

Classification 7-8

Semifinals

Classification 5-6

Classification 3-4

Final

Final standing

All-Star Team

Most Valuable Player

Best Setter

Best Opposite

Best Outside Hitters

Best Middle Blockers

Best Libero

External links
 NORCECA

2014 in volleyball
Men's NORCECA Volleyball Championship
2014 in Salvadoran sport
International volleyball competitions hosted by El Salvador